Michael Tamoaieta (6 July 1995 – 1 March 2019) was a Samoan-born rugby union player.

Tamoaieta died on 1 March 2019.

Professional career

2017–2019 
In August 2017, the North Harbour Rugby Union released their 33-man squad for the 2017 Mitre 10 Cup with the inclusion of Tamoaieta. He was one of five players announced to make their debut in week one of the competition against Otago at QBE Stadium. Tamoaieta started in the match day fifteen at tighthead prop.

Personal life

Death 
Tamoaieta died on 1 March 2019, aged 23, at his home in Auckland which was announced on social media by his partner Helen Ti'eti'e the following day. The cause of death was not made public. Tributes and condolences were offered by New Zealand Rugby chief executive Steve Tew, New Zealand international Ardie Savea, and the Blues Super Rugby franchise. In week two of the 2019 Super Rugby season, New Zealand teams, the Chiefs, the Crusaders, and the Blues wore black armbands to pay their respects and an acknowledgment of his life at their respective games in Hamilton, Brisbane, and Argentina.

Statistics 

Updated: 29 September 2018
Source: Michael Tamoaieta Rugby History

References 

1995 births
2019 deaths
New Zealand rugby union players
North Harbour rugby union players
Blues (Super Rugby) players
Samoan emigrants to New Zealand
New Zealand people of i-Kiribati descent
Rugby union props